Fort Pierre is a city in Stanley County, South Dakota, United States. It is part of the Pierre, South Dakota micropolitan area and the county seat of Stanley County. The population was 2,115 at the 2020 census.

The settlement of Fort Pierre developed around an 1832 trading post and fort situated on the west bank of the Missouri River, near the confluence with its tributary Bad River. An earlier American-owned trading post had been operating nearby since 1817, and in 2017 the city celebrated its bicentennial of continuous permanent settlement.

History
On March 30, 1743, Francois and Louis-Joseph Gaultier de La Vérendrye reached the area of present-day Fort Pierre during an expedition west from Quebec, a French colony in present-day Canada. They left a lead plate buried in a hill to claim the land for the King of France. In the 1803 Louisiana Purchase, the United States acquired this area and the remainder of France's vast territory west of the Mississippi River.

President Thomas Jefferson commissioned the Lewis and Clark Corps of Discovery Expedition in 1804 to explore the territory, especially by traveling west to the Upper Missouri and Platte rivers, in the hope of finding a water route to the Pacific Ocean. They met with the Teton Sioux on the south side of the mouth of the Bad River on September 24-28, 1804.

In 1817 fur trader Joseph La Framboise, Jr., an agent for the American Fur Company, established Fort Tecumseh a mile to the north, on what is now La Framboise Island in the Missouri River. The fur trade was highly lucrative and attracted competitors. In 1832, Pierre Chouteau, Jr., a major fur trader from St Louis, replaced that early facility with Fort Pierre Chouteau, a trading post and fort on the west side of the Missouri and north side of the Bad River's mouth.

The city of Fort Pierre gradually developed around the trading post. Fort Pierre celebrated its Bicentennial in 2017, marking 200 years of continuous permanent settlement at the confluence of the Missouri and Bad rivers.

In 1880, the settlement of Pierre was founded on the east side of the Missouri River in Hughes. Because it was centrally located and reached first by the railroad, it was designated by the state legislature as the state capital when South Dakota was admitted as a state.

Geography
Fort Pierre is located at  (44.358941, -100.375742).  Across the Missouri River from Fort Pierre is the state capital of South Dakota, Pierre.

Fort Pierre has been assigned the ZIP code 57532 and the FIPS place code 22260.

Although Fort Pierre is located in the Mountain Time Zone, most residents of the city use Central Time because of close social and economic ties with Pierre, which is located in the Central Time Zone.

Demographics

2010 census
As of the census of 2010, there were 2,078 people, 893 households, and 586 families living in the city. The racial makeup of the city was 89.4% White, 0.3% African American, 6.6% Native American, 0.2% Asian, 0.2% from other races, and 3.3% from two or more races. Hispanic or Latino of any race were 0.7% of the population.

There were 893 households, of which 30.5% had children under the age of 18 living with them, 51.6% were married couples living together, 9.7% had a female householder with no husband present, 4.3% had a male householder with no wife present, and 34.4% were non-families. 30.6% of all households were made up of individuals, and 11.2% had someone living alone who was 65 years of age or older. The average household size was 2.33 and the average family size was 2.86.

The median age in the city was 41.8 years. 24.1% of residents were under the age of 18; 6.6% were between the ages of 18 and 24; 23.2% were from 25 to 44; 30% were from 45 to 64; and 16% were 65 years of age or older. The gender makeup of the city was 49.4% male and 50.6% female.

2000 census
As of the census of 2000, there were 1,991 people, 810 households, and 538 families living in the city. The population density was 686.6 people per square mile (265.1/km2). There were 875 housing units at an average density of 301.8 per square mile (116.5/km2). The racial makeup of the city was 92.16% White, 0.20% African American, 5.22% Native American, 0.30% Asian, 0.15% from other races, and 1.96% from two or more races. Hispanic or Latino of any race were 0.40% of the population.

There were 810 households, out of which 34.3% had children under the age of 18 living with them, 51.4% were married couples living together, 10.9% had a female householder with no husband present, and 33.5% were non-families. 28.4% of all households were made up of individuals, and 8.9% had someone living alone who was 65 years of age or older. The average household size was 2.45 and the average family size was 3.01.

In the city, the population was spread out, with 28.0% under the age of 18, 6.9% from 18 to 24, 28.3% from 25 to 44, 25.4% from 45 to 64, and 11.3% who were 65 years of age or older. The median age was 37 years. For every 100 females, there were 99.9 males. For every 100 females age 18 and over, there were 95.8 males.

As of 2000 the median income for a household in the city was $41,181, and the median income for a family was $47,885. Males had a median income of $29,948 versus $21,208 for females. The per capita income for the city was $20,478. About 7.4% of families and 8.9% of the population were below the poverty line, including 12.2% of those under age 18 and 14.8% of those age 65 or over.

Climate 
The data here are for a weather station 17 miles west-southwest of Fort Pierre, near Wendte. Fort Pierre's reading of 120 °F is tied for the highest temperature recorded in the state of South Dakota (the other occurrence of 120 °F was at Gann Valley in 1934).

Media
AM Radio

 KGFX (AM) 1060, (Country music)
 KCCR AM 1240, (Adult Contemporary)

FM Radio

 KGFX-FM 92.7, (Adult Contemporary)
 KPLO-FM 94.5, (Country music)
 KLXS FM 95.3, (Classic Hits)
 KJBI FM 100.1, (Classic Hits)

Television

 KTSD-TV Ch. 10 PBS
 KPLO-TV Ch. 13 CBS
 KDLV-TV Ch. 26 NBC

The Capital Journal is the local newspaper.

Notable people
 Pierre Chouteau Jr. (1789-1865) - French merchant, trader and entrepreneur after whom Pierre and Fort Pierre, South Dakota, are named.
 John C. Waldron - World War II aviator from Fort Pierre.
 Walter Dale Miller - Former governor.
 Casey Tibbs - American cowboy and actor.
 Clint Roberts - U.S. Representative

External links
 Travel: Fort Pierre Chouteau, National Park Service website

References

Cities in South Dakota
Cities in Stanley County, South Dakota
County seats in South Dakota
Pierre, South Dakota micropolitan area
South Dakota populated places on the Missouri River
Forts in South Dakota
Forts along the Missouri River